Judas is an upcoming first-person shooter developed and published by Ghost Story Games. It is Ken Levine's first video game since Bioshock Infinite: Burial at Sea in 2014. The game is set to be released for Windows PC, PlayStation 5 and Xbox Series X and Series S.

Development 
Judas is the debut title for Ghost Story Games, a studio founded by Ken Levine following the shutdown of Irrational Games, the developer of the BioShock series. The game's concept started in 2014, when Levine talked and explained ideas that they would want to work on during Game Developers Conference with "narrative Legos", where they can alter story elements, which they can use make a very re-playable game, with multiple outcomes. The following year, Levine stated that this game would be a first-person science fiction game, similar to the System Shock series. Middle-earth: Shadow of Mordor, in particular its Nemesis system, was cited as one of the game's inspirations. Levine added that the game would be a more challenging experience when compared with BioShock and BioShock Infinite. At the start of 2022, Bloomberg News reported that the game has fallen into development hell, with Levine's style of workplace leading to employee burnout. At the end of the same year, at The Game Awards 2022, the game was revealed with an announcement trailer to positive reception. Judas will be released on Microsoft Windows via Steam and Epic Games platform. Take-Two Interactive, Ghost Story's owner, expects the game to release by March 2025 at the latest.

References

External links
 

Upcoming video games
First-person shooters
Video games directed by Ken Levine
PlayStation 5 games
Xbox Series X and Series S games
Windows games
Adventure games
Video games developed in the United States
Immersive sims
Take-Two Interactive games
Single-player video games
Unreal Engine games